The Clan Moroghoe is an Irish clan, descended from Murcha, who was a descendant of Labhradh, the son of Breasal Bealach. From Murcha came the patronymic MacMuircha or MacMurchadha which, according to John O'Hart, was anglicised as MacMorough, MacMorrow and Morrow. There are a number of spellings for the clan which include, MacMurroghowe, MacMoroghoe, Murroghowe, Moroghoe, Morrow and Murrow. Eventually these names were anglicised into the more recognisable Murrow, MacMorrow, Morrow and (occasionally) Morrowson.

References

Moroghoe
Gaelic families of Norse descent